Yu Chenggang (born 23 February 1984) is a Chinese rower. He competed in the men's lightweight coxless four event at the 2016 Summer Olympics.

References

External links
 

1984 births
Living people
Chinese male rowers
Olympic rowers of China
Rowers at the 2012 Summer Olympics
Rowers at the 2016 Summer Olympics
Place of birth missing (living people)
Asian Games medalists in rowing
Rowers at the 2014 Asian Games
Asian Games gold medalists for China
Medalists at the 2014 Asian Games
World Rowing Championships medalists for China
Sportspeople from Chengdu
Rowers from Sichuan
20th-century Chinese people
21st-century Chinese people